Bernard Maynard Lucas Brodhurst (6 August 1873 – 27 April 1915) was an English cricketer. Brodhurst was a right-handed batsman who bowled right-arm fast-medium.

Brodhurst made a single first-class appearance for Hampshire in 1897, against Warwickshire.

Brodhurst served in the First World War, where on the Western Front he obtained the rank of Major while serving with the 4th Gurkha Rifles. While engaged in fighting near the Belgian city of Ypres on 27 April 1915 Brodhurst died.

External links
Bernard Brodhurst at Cricinfo
Bernard Brodhurst at CricketArchive

1873 births
1915 deaths
English cricketers
Hampshire cricketers
British Indian Army officers
Indian Army personnel killed in World War I
Athletes from Varanasi
Cricketers from Uttar Pradesh
Military personnel of British India